Javed Ahmed Khan  is an Indian politician from the All India Trinamool Congress (TMC) party and the present Minister for Disaster Management in the Government of West Bengal. He is also an MLA, elected from the Kasba constituency in the 2011 West Bengal state assembly election. He is politician of the All India Trinamool Congress (TMC) party. He is a long-standing politician, and a social worker. Born in 1956, Javed Ahmed Khan completed a Bachelor of Commerce (Hons.) from St. Xavier's College, Kolkata in 1978. Khan got involved in public service.

In the year 2006, the people of Ballygunge (South Kolkata, West Bengal, India) elected Khan as their representative (MLA) in the West Bengal Legislative Assembly.

Khan has also served as a councillor of Ward no. 66 (Topsia) from 1995 to 2010. In addition, in the year 2000–2005, Khan was sworn in as the Member, Mayor in Council (Health) of the Kolkata Municipal Corporation (KMC), headed by Subrata Mukherjee (former Mayor of Kolkata). Nonetheless, from 2005 to 2010, Khan was elected as the Leader of the Opposition in the KMC.

References 

State cabinet ministers of West Bengal
Living people
1956 births
West Bengal MLAs 2006–2011
West Bengal MLAs 2011–2016
West Bengal MLAs 2016–2021